Etgar Keret (born August 20, 1967) is an Israeli writer known for his short stories, graphic novels, and scriptwriting for film and television.

Personal life

Keret was born in Ramat Gan, Israel in 1967. He is a third child to parents who survived the Holocaust. Both of his parents are from Poland. He studied at Ohel Shem high school, and at the Adi Lautman Interdisciplinary Programme for Outstanding Students of Tel Aviv University. He lives in Tel Aviv with his wife, Shira Geffen, and their son, Lev. He is a lecturer at Ben-Gurion University of the Negev in Beer Sheva, and at Tel Aviv University. He holds dual Israeli and Polish citizenship.

Literary career
Keret's first published work was Pipelines (Tzinorot, 1992), a collection of short stories which was largely ignored when it came out. His second book, Missing Kissinger (Ga'agu'ai le-Kissinger, 1994), a collection of fifty very short stories, caught the attention of the general public. The short story "Siren", which deals with the paradoxes of modern Israeli society, is included in the curriculum for the Israeli matriculation exam in literature.

Keret has co-authored several comic books, among them Nobody Said It Was Going to Be Fun (Lo banu leihanot, 1996) with Rutu Modan and Streets of Fury (סמטאות הזעם, Simtaot Haza'am, 1997) with Asaf Hanuka. In 1999, five of his stories were translated into English, and adapted into "graphic novellas" under the joint title Jetlag. The illustrators were the five members of the Actus Tragicus collective.

In 1998, Keret published Kneller's Happy Campers (Hakaytana Shel Kneller), a collection of short stories. The title story, the longest in the collection, follows a young man who commits suicide and goes on a quest for love in the afterlife. It appears in the English language collection of Keret's stories The Bus Driver Who Wanted To Be God & Other Stories (2004) and was adapted into the graphic novel Pizzeria Kamikaze (2006), with illustrations by Asaf Hanuka. Keret's latest short story collections are Anihu (literally I-am-him, 2002; translated into English as Cheap Moon, after one of the other stories in the collection) and Pitom Defikah Ba-delet (translated into English as Suddenly a Knock at the Door).

Keret also wrote a children's book Dad Runs Away with the Circus (2004), illustrated by Rutu Modan.

Keret publishes some of his works on the Hebrew-language web site "Bimah Hadashah" (New Stage).

His 2019 book published in English as Fly Already (literally Glitch at the Edge of the Galaxy) won Israel’s prestigious Sapir Prize in Literature. The prize includes a paid translation of the winning book into any language of the author’s choosing, and Keret gained some attention for selecting Yiddish. This was the first time an author had chosen that language in the prize’s 20-year history.

Other media
Keret has worked in Israeli television and film, including three seasons as a writer for the popular sketch show The Cameri Quintet. He also wrote the story for the 2001 TV movie Aball'e starring Shmil Ben Ari.

In 2006, Wristcutters: A Love Story, a dark comedy/love story  based on Keret's novella Kneller's Happy Campers, premiered at the Sundance Film Festival. The story was adapted by director Goran Dukić into a film starring Patrick Fugit, Shannyn Sossamon, Tom Waits and Will Arnett.

Etgar and his wife Shira directed the 2007 film Jellyfish, based on a story written by Shira.

$9.99, a stop motion animated feature film, was released in 2009. Written by Keret and directed by Tatia Rosenthal, it is an Israeli/Australian co-production featuring the voices of Geoffrey Rush, Anthony LaPaglia and other leading Australian actors.

In 2010 a short feature film based on Keret's story was released. An Exclusive novella was adapted and directed by the young Polish director Krzysztof Szot. The film, also known as Wyłączność (An Exclusive), was presented at the Cannes Film Festival 2010 in the Short Film Corner section.

Keret's work is frequently featured on the National Public Radio program This American Life, which has presented readings of eight of his stories.

In October 2011 the public radio show Selected Shorts devoted an entire show to live readings of Keret's stories, including “Suddenly a Knock at the Door,” “Halibut," “Lieland”, and “Fatso.” Keret himself introduced several of the stories.

In August 2012, the short film Glue  based on Etgar Keret's short story "Crazy Glue", participated in the Rhode Island International Film Festival.

In May 2013, the short film LieLand, adapted and directed by Silvia Grossmann, a Brazilian/American filmmaker, premiered at the Cannes Film Festival.

In 2017, Keret's short story Parallel Universes was adapted into a short film by British-Israeli actor Liran Nathan. The film was screened at various international film festivals including the Newport Beach Film Festival and the British Urban Film Festival.

Writing style

Keret's writing style is lean, using everyday language, slang, and dialect. His work has influenced many writers of his generation, as well as bringing a renewed surge in popularity for the short story form in Israel in the second half of the 1990s.

According to linguist Ghil'ad Zuckermann, Etgar Keret was criticized by linguist Menahem Zevi Kaddari "for using a 'thin language' – as opposed to Shmuel Yosef Agnon". Zuckermann defends Keret and argues that "Kaddari compares Keret to Agnon as if they wrote in two different registers of the same language" whereas "Keret is, in fact, writing in a different language. Whilst Agnon attempts to write in (Mishnaic) Hebrew, which is obviously not his mother tongue (Yiddish), Keret writes authentically in his native Israeli." Zuckermann provides an example: when Agnon wrote, in 1944, אשתו מתה עליו ishtó méta alàv, literally "his wife died/dies on him", he meant "he became a widower". When Keret says so, he means "his wife loves him very much".

Awards
Keret has received the Prime Minister's award for literature, as well as the Ministry of Culture's Cinema Prize. In 2006 he was chosen as an outstanding artist of the prestigious Israel Cultural Excellence Foundation.

In 1993 he won the first prize in the Alternative Theater Festival in Akko for Entebbe: A Musical, which he wrote with Jonathan Bar Giora.

The short film Malka Lev Adom (Skin Deep, 1996), which Keret wrote and directed with Ran Tal, won an Israel Film Academy award and first place in the Munich International Festival of Film Schools. The film Jellyfish, a joint venture for Keret and his wife received the Camera d'Or prize at the 2007 Cannes Film Festival. Missing Kissinger won the 2008 JQ Wingate Prize.

Keret was on the jury for the 2010 Neustadt International Prize for Literature.

In 2010, Keret received the Chevalier (Knight) Medallion of France's Ordre des Arts et des Lettres.

He has received the Charles Bronfman Prize for 2016.

Keret received the 2018 Sapir Prize for Literature for his short-story collection Takalah be-Katzeh ha-Galaksiya (Hebrew title:  תקלה בקצה הגלקסיה, "A Glitch at the Edge of the Galaxy") whose English translation, Fly Already, won the 2019 National Jewish Book Award for Fiction. This book also appeared in a Bulgarian translation in 2020.

Inspirations
Slaughterhouse-Five by Kurt Vonnegut
The Metamorphosis by Franz Kafka
The Sound and the Fury by William Faulkner
Miller's Crossing by the Coen brothers
Twelve Monkeys by Terry Gilliam

Criticism
A review of Missing Kissinger by Todd McEwen describes Etgar Keret's locale as that of "male confusion, loneliness, blundering, bellowing and, above all, stasis. His narrator is trapped in an angry masculine wistfulness which is awful to behold in its masturbatory disconnection from the world's real possibilities and pleasures." Keret is "not much of a stylist - you get the impression that he throws three or four of these stories off on the bus to work every morning," and his "wild, blackly inventive pieces...might have been dreamed up by a mad scientist rather than a writer."

Works

Short fiction 
Collections
 The Bus Driver Who Wanted to Be God & Other Stories, New York: Toby Press, 2004,  (paperback).
Includes "Kneller's Happy Campers" and other stories.
 Gaza Blues with Samir El-Youssef, London: David Paul, 2004, .
 15 short stories by Keret and a novella by El-Youssef.
 The Nimrod Flipout, Farrar, Straus and Giroux, 2006,  (paperback).
Selections from Keret's four short-story collections.
 Missing Kissinger, Vintage Books, 2008,  (paperback).
 The Girl On The Fridge, Farrar, Straus and Giroux, 2008,  (paperback).
Includes "Crazy Glue" and other short stories from Keret's first collections.
 Four Stories, Syracuse University Press, 2010,  (paperback).
A Moonless Night (Am Oved Publishers Ltdd., 2010) with Shira Geffen and David Polonsky
 Suddenly, a Knock on the Door, Farrar, Straus and Giroux, 2012,  (paperback).
 Fly Already, Granta Books, 2019,  

Stories

Comics
Jetlag, Tel Aviv, Actus Tragicus, 1998; Top Shelf Productions, 1999, .
Pizzeria Kamikaze, illustrated by Asaf Hanuka, Alternative Comics, 2005, .

Children's books
Dad Runs Away With The Circus, Cambridge, MA: Candlewick Press, 2004, .

Memoirs

Mini Series 

 The Middleman. 2020

See also
Keret House - maybe the narrowest house in the world.

Notes

References

External links
Etgar Keret - official website

Biography
Institute for Translation of Hebrew Literature - bio and list of works
Israel Cultural Excellence Foundation - bio and press reviews

Interviews
 Meakin Armstrong interviews Etgar Keret in Guernica (magazine), [August, 2015)
 Interview, The Observer, February 13, 2005.
 interview The Believer (April 2006).
 A Conversation With Etgar Keret by George Saunders at the 2007 PEN World Voices Festival, Script
 A Conversation With Etgar Keret by George Saunders at the 2007 PEN World Voices Festival, Audio
 Interview CBC (May 2008)
 Interview, Tikkun magazine (September/October 2005).
 Conversation with Etgar Keret, Pandalous
 WWB Interviews Etgar Keret on Tradition, Translation, and Alien Toasters, Words Without Borders
 Suddenly: An Interview with Etgar Keret, Rain Taxi (Summer 2012)

Works
 "Second Chance" - a short story, Guernica Magazine (January 2010)
 "The Nimrod Flip Out"  - a short story, Zoetrope: All-Story (Summer 2004)
 "One Hundred Percent" - a short story, LA Weekly (March 2007)
 Etgar Keret reads "Hat Trick" from The Girl on the Fridge, PEN American Center (2008)
 Myth Milk by: Etgar Keret from The Girl on the Fridge, PEN American Center
 "An Exclusive" - a short story, LA Weekly (September 2007)
 "Freeze" - a short story, LA Weekly (January 2008)
 "Loquat" - a short story, LA Weekly (April 2008)
 "Snot" - a short story, Pandalous (September 2009)
 Etgar Keret at Bamah Hadashah - selected works (in Hebrew)
 Magic & childhood - Three tales of innocence from Israel

Articles and reviews
Stupor in Our Times - article on Israeli politics by Keret, originally published in The New York Times (March 2006), via PEN American Center.
The Incursion of Politics into the Private Sphere Article by Lewis Gropp about Keret's joint project with Samir El-Youssef, Qantara.de (August 2006)
Review of The Nimrod Flipout - By Michael Lukas, Tikkun magazine
Translating Monsters into Songbirds: the Stories of Etgar Keret  - By James Warner, Identity Theory

Related sites
Wristcutters: A Love Story, official website of the film.
Glue, official website of the film.

1967 births
Jewish Israeli writers
Israeli Jews
Living people
Academic staff of Tel Aviv University
Israeli male short story writers
Israeli short story writers
Israeli comics writers
Israeli people of Polish-Jewish descent
People from Ramat Gan
International Writing Program alumni
The New Yorker people
Adi Lautman Interdisciplinary Program for Outstanding Students alumni
Directors of Caméra d'Or winners
20th-century Israeli writers
21st-century Israeli writers